Beate Hofmann (born October 15, 1963 in Bad Tölz) is a German Lutheran bishop.

Life 
Hofmann studied Lutheran theology at Kirchliche Hochschule Bethel in Bielefeld, Heidelberg University, Northwestern University, University of Hamburg, and Ludwig Maximilian University of Munich. On October 31, 1993 she was ordained pastor in the Evangelical Lutheran Church in Bavaria. Until 1996 she was a pastor at Reformations-Gedächtnis-Kirche in München-Großhadern.

In 1999 she was awarded a Ph.D. in practical theology by Ludwig Maximilian University of Munich. From 1998 to 2003 she was theological director of studies at Diakonie Neuendettelsau, and from 2003 to 2013 a professor at Lutheran University in Nuremberg (now Lutheran University of Applied Sciences Nuremberg). In 2012 she completed her habilitation at Augustana Divinity School Neuendettelsau with an empirical study on religious education for adults, and in 2013 was appointed professor for diaconal science and diaconal management at the Kirchliche Hochschule Wuppertal/Bethel, where in 2017 she became the director of the Institut für Diakoniewissenschaft und Diakoniemanagement (Institute for Diaconal Studies and Diaconal Management).

In 2019 Hofmann was elected bishop of Evangelical Church of Hesse Electorate-Waldeck.

Works by Hofmann 
 . Kohlhammer Verlag, Munich 2000.  [Zugleich Dissertation, 1999].
 . Evangelische Verlagsanstalt, Leipzig 2013.  
 , together with Cornelia Coenen-Marx, Otto Haussecker, Dörte Rasch and Beate Baberske Krohs, Kohlhammer Stuttgart 2008,Second edition 2010, (Reihe Diakonie: Bildung – Gestaltung – Organisation Bd. 2). .
 Together with Martin Büscher: . Nomos, Baden-Baden 2017. .
 Together with Cornelia Coenen-Marx: . Kohlhammer Stuttgart 2017. .
 Together with Barbara Montag: , Kohlhammer Stuttgart 2018. .

External links 

 Beate Hofmann at Homepage by Kirchliche Hochschule Wuppertal/Bethel.
 NN: Beate Hofmann als neue Bischöfin von Kurhessen-Waldeck ins Amt eingeführt
 Homepage by EKKW: Bischöfin Dr. Hofmann: «Christliche Gemeinschaft ist ein Sorgenetz in Zeiten der Verunsicherung!», October 13, 2019

References 

21st-century Lutheran bishops
21st-century German Lutheran bishops
1963 births
Women Lutheran bishops
21st-century German Protestant theologians
Women Christian theologians
People from Bad Tölz
Living people